Joseph Howard Berry Jr. (December 31, 1894 – April 29, 1976) was a professional baseball second baseman and pinch runner, and an All-American football halfback.

Berry was an All-American halfback for the University of Pennsylvania in 1916 and 1917. He later played parts of two seasons in Major League Baseball, 1921 and 1922, for the New York Giants. In 1921, he appeared in seven games as a second baseman. During 1922, he appeared in six games, exclusively as a pinch runner.

Personal Information
Joe's father, Joseph Howard Berry, Sr., was also a major leaguer, playing for the Philadelphia Phillies in 1902.

See also
 1916 College Football All-America Team
 List of second-generation Major League Baseball players

Sources

1894 births
1976 deaths
American football halfbacks
Burials at West Laurel Hill Cemetery
Major League Baseball second basemen
New York Giants (NL) players
Hamilton Continentals football coaches
Penn Quakers football players
Players of American football from Philadelphia
Baseball players from Philadelphia